Aryana is a 2012 Philippine fantasy drama television series starring Ella Cruz in her first leading role. The series premiered on ABS-CBN's Primetime Bida evening block from May 7, 2012 to January 25, 2013, replacing Precious Hearts Romances Presents: Lumayo Ka Man Sa Akin and was replaced by Kahit Konting Pagtingin.

Overview

Synopsis 
Aryana narrates the journey of a girl as she struggles in the awkward but exciting adolescent stage while trying to escape her inevitable destiny as a mermaid on her fourteenth birthday.

Two mothers from entirely different worlds play major roles in the story. Ofelia is a human, who struggles for the acceptance of her mother-in-law, and hopes that with the birth of her daughter she will gain the happiness of her husband's family. Neptuna, an adult mermaid with a bright orange-and-gold scaly fish tail whose pure and strong motherly love for her daughter, Perlita, knows no bounds and will do anything to make sure she is safe and happy. Perlita was fascinated with humans and dreams of living happily with them, often going near the seashore to watch the humans. She even once stole the mystical pearl that can transform a mermaid into a human and back at will. Unfortunately, when she went near the seashore to watch humans who were playing with firecrackers, a drunken villager carried a dynamite. Victor, Ofelia's husband, confronts him and unknowingly throws the dynamite into the part of the sea where Perlita was hiding. Neptuna went to warn her daughter, but was not able to make it in time. Thus, she saw the death of her dearly beloved daughter and angrily promises to do everything she can to make Victor and Ofelia feel the intense pain and sorrow of losing their own beloved daughter. Ofelia and Victor's child, whom they named Aryana, was then born. As Ofelia was hoping for, she gained the acceptance of her mother-in-law.

During Aryana's baptismal celebration, Neptuna (as a human woman) steals newborn Ayrana, raising her as her own daughter for a while until she discovered that she cannot make Aryana a complete mermaid unless her mother gives her to her willingly. The presumed lost of their daughter caused Victor and Ofelia's family to break up. Neptuna reluctantly gave Aryana back to Ofelia with the agreement that on Aryana's fourteenth birthday she must give her back to her. Ofelia desperately accepts, and with no intention of giving her daughter back, she runs away from their seaside village and goes to the urban city to forget about the mermaid curse on her daughter, just as Neptuna thought she would. Every day, Ofelia gets a reminder that her daughter is and will forever belong to the sea when she turns fourteen. Aryana, who does not know that she is forever cursed to become a mermaid, lives out her dream of being a professional swimmer or dancer; unaware of her inherent abilities over water. As she faces her fate of becoming a mermaid, Aryana is torn between choosing the sea and the surface world of humans where her heart belongs.

Cast and characters

Main cast
Ella Cruz as Aryana Capuyao-Mendez
Francis Magundayao as Adrian "Ian" Alejandro
Paul Salas as Marlon Salvador
Dominic Roque as Hubert Francisco
Michelle Vito as Megan Cervantes-Mendez

Supporting cast
Pokwang as Ofelia Capuyao-Mendez
Tonton Gutierrez as Victor Mendez
Desiree del Valle as Neptuna
G. Toengi as Stella Cervantes
Laurice Guillen as Elnora Mendez
Bianca Manalo as Carlina Suarez
Tetchie Agbayani as Reyna Yasmin
Neil Coleta as Andoy Capuyao
Lotlot de Leon as Rosita Salvador
Louise Abuel as Miko Salvador
David Chua as Melvin Abad
Eunice Lagusad as Elizabeth "Bebet" Teves
Mel Kimura as Sylvia "Ibiang" Francisco
Andre Tiangco as Anton
Celine Lim as Trisha Reyes
Noemi Oineza as Chelsea Montes
Vanjo Cuenca as Aries Ocampo
Lander Vera Perez as Rick Alejandro
Richard Quan as Jason Cervantes
Michael Conan as Allan
Boom Labrusca as Tilapio
Chokoleit as Dikya
Marvin Yap as Pla Pla
Badjie Mortiz as Bisugo

Guest cast
Dexie Daulat as young Aryana
Elijah Magundayao as young Ian
Kristoff Meneses as young Marlon
Maliksi Morales as young Andoy
Alyanna Angeles as young Megan
Quintin Alianza as young Melvin
Carlo Lacana as teenage Andoy
Yong An Chiu as teenage Melvin
Jane Oineza as Perlita
Edgar Sandalo as Badong
Kurt Del Rosario as Ruben

Production
In an interview on August 13, 2012, Ella Cruz announced the extension of the hit series until January 2013 due to its success on its timeslot. It was part of the 2012 primetime block which includes Princess and I, Walang Hanggan, Ina, Kapatid, Anak and Kahit Puso'y Masugatan. It airs at 5:45 pm before its nightly news program TV Patrol, and internationally on TFC.

See also 
List of programs broadcast by ABS-CBN
List of ABS-CBN drama series

References

External links 

ABS-CBN drama series
Television series by Dreamscape Entertainment Television
2012 Philippine television series debuts
2013 Philippine television series endings
Fantaserye and telefantasya
Mermaids in television
Philippine teen drama television series
Filipino-language television shows
Television shows set in the Philippines
Television series about teenagers